Kau Shat Wan (literally dog flea bay) was a bay located between Discovery Bay and Mui Wo on Lantau Island, New Territories, Hong Kong. In the 1990s, the Hong Kong Government decided to reclaim the bay to construct a Government explosives depot and replace the one on Stonecutters Island. The depot started operation in 1997.

An automatic irrigation system run by solar power was tried out on a vegetated slope at Kau Shat Wan. The dismantled components of Queen's Pier are now also stored in there.

See also
 Man Kok Tsui

References 

Bays of Hong Kong
Lantau Island